Clann Fhergail was a cantred located in County Galway, comprising the baronies of Moycullen and Galway, the parishes of Oranmore and Ballynacourty and Rahoon.

Crichaireacht cinedach nduchasa Muintiri Murchada is a tract dating to the reign of its overlord, Flaithbertaigh Ua Flaithbertaigh (died 1098, King of Connacht from 1092-1098). It lists the main families and their estates within Clann Fhergail. The first listed was the family of Halloran.

See also

 Uí Fiachrach Aidhne
 Clann Taidg
 Conmhaícne Mara
 Delbhna Tir Dha Locha
 Muintir Murchada
 Senchineoil
 Uí Maine
 Soghain
 Trícha Máenmaige
 Uí Díarmata
 Cóiced Ol nEchmacht
 Síol Anmchadha
 Iar Connacht
 Maigh Seola
 Cenél Áeda na hEchtge
 Cenél Guaire
 Muintir Máelfináin
 Conmaícne Cenéoil Dubáin
 Conmaícne Cúile Toland
 Bunrath
 Uí Briúin Rátha
 Tír Maine
 Uí Briúin Seola
 Machaire Riabhach
 Maigh Mucruimhe
 Airthir Connacht
 Meadraige
 Corca Moga
 Óic Bethra

References

 Medieval Ireland: Territorial, Political and Economic Divisions, Paul MacCotter, Four Courts Press, 2008, pp. 133–134. 

History of County Galway
Gaelic-Irish nations and dynasties
Connacht
Geography of County Galway